Miletus or Miletos, was a town of ancient Paphlagonia, located on the road between Amastris and Sinope. 

The site of Miletus is unlocated.

References

Populated places in ancient Paphlagonia
Former populated places in Turkey
Lost ancient cities and towns